List of occupations requiring sewing skills.

 Bookbinder
 Cordwainer
 Corsetier
 Draper
 Dressmaker
 Embroiderer
 Glover
 Hatter
 Leatherworker
 Milliner
 Parachute rigger
 Quilter
 Sailmaker
 Seamstress
 Shoemaker
 Tailor
 Taxidermist
 Upholsterer

Sewing
Sew